Mishev Bluff is the mostly ice-covered bluff rising to 600 m in Brugmann Mountains on Liège Island in the Palmer Archipelago, Antarctica.  It has precipitous and partly ice-free southwest slopes, and surmounts Zbelsurd Glacier to the north and Pleystor Glacier to the south.

The feature is named after Emil Mishev, geologist at St. Kliment Ohridski base in 2004/05 and subsequent seasons, and base commander during part of the 2006/07 season.

Location
British mapping in 1980.

Maps
 British Antarctic Territory.  Scale 1:200000 topographic map.  DOS 610 Series, Sheet W 64 62.  Directorate of Overseas Surveys, UK, 1980.
 Antarctic Digital Database (ADD). Scale 1:250000 topographic map of Antarctica. Scientific Committee on Antarctic Research (SCAR). Since 1993, regularly upgraded and updated.

References
 Bulgarian Antarctic Gazetteer. Antarctic Place-names Commission. (details in Bulgarian, basic data in English)
 Mishev Peak. SCAR Composite Antarctic Gazetteer.

External links
 Mishev Bluff. Copernix satellite image

Mountains of the Palmer Archipelago
Bulgaria and the Antarctic
Liège Island